Hell Has No Limits ("The Place Without Limits") is a 1966 novel written by Chilean José Donoso. The novel is set south of the Chilean capital, Santiago, in a small town near the regional center of Talca. It tells the story of a bordello, and details the prostitutes' way of life. The main character is Manuela, the transgender woman who owns the bordello. A number of other memorable characters are introduced. The novel was well received, and Donoso himself considered it his best work: "the most perfect, with fewest errors, the most complete".

Title
The title Hell Has No Limits refers to a line in Marlowe's play Doctor Faustus, where the character Mephistophilis says:

Hell hath no limits, nor is circumscrib'd
In one self place; for where we are is hell,
And where hell is, there must we ever be.
—Doctor Faustus, Act II, scene i, line 118

Film adaptation
In 1978, the book was made into a film of the same name.

Editions available
 Carlos Fuentes / José Donoso / Severo Sarduy (1972). Triple Cross: Holy Place / Hell Has No Limits / From Cuba with a Song, Dutton.
 . Trans. Suzanne Jill Devine.
 . Trans. Suzanne Jill Devine.

Notes

1966 novels
Novels by José Donoso
Chilean novels adapted into films
Novels about prostitution
Prostitution in Chile
1960s LGBT novels
Novels with transgender themes
Novels set in Chile